The Duff Barn is a historic building located on a farm north of Winterset, Iowa, United States.  Silas Barnes bought  in 1847, and received the deed in 1850.  Robert Duff bought  from him, and Samuel and Jeannie Duff bought that same parcel in 1870.  Robert died in 1873 and Samuel in 1876.  This barn was built by one of them, but it is unknown by which one.  It was built with locally quarried limestone.  It is attributed to David Harris because the following elements of his work are found here: a rectangle plan that is asymmetrically massed, two-against-one broken bond, and textured surfaces on the quoins, jambs and lintels.  The barn was listed together on the National Register of Historic Places in 1993.

References

Infrastructure completed in 1870
Vernacular architecture in Iowa
Buildings and structures in Madison County, Iowa
National Register of Historic Places in Madison County, Iowa
Barns on the National Register of Historic Places in Iowa